Pilgrim's Progress: Journey to Heaven (or simply Pilgrim's Progress) is a 2008 Christian film based on John Bunyan’s classic 1678 novel The Pilgrim's Progress. It was written and directed by Danny Carrales, and starred Daniel Kruse as Christian. The film was featured at the Merrimack Valley Christian Film Festival.

Plot 
Set in the modern day, the main character in the film, Christian (Daniel Kruse) is concerned about the well-being of his family after reading the Bible which says that the city will be destroyed by fire. It becomes a burden for him, but his family and friends reject the warnings in the Bible. He begins his journey to The Celestial City where he has been told that he will find safety from the coming destruction and relief from his burden.

Cast 
Daniel Kruse as Christian
Terry Jernigan as Faithful and Apollyon (voice)
Jeremiah Guelzo as Hopeful
Hugh McLean as Evangelist
Reid Dalton as Giant Despair
Neal Brasher as Envy

References

External links 
 
 

John Bunyan
2008 films
Films about evangelicalism
Films based on British novels
2008 drama films
Demons in film
2000s English-language films